Clavija is a genus of flowering plants belonging to the family Primulaceae.

Its native range is Tropical America.

Species:

Clavija biborrana 
Clavija caloneura 
Clavija cardenasii 
Clavija cauliflora 
Clavija clavata 
Clavija colombiana 
Clavija costaricana 
Clavija domingensis 
Clavija eggersiana 
Clavija elliptica 
Clavija engelsii 
Clavija euerganea 
Clavija fernandezii 
Clavija fusca 
Clavija grandis 
Clavija harlingii 
Clavija hookeri 
Clavija imatacae 
Clavija imazae 
Clavija jelskii 
Clavija kalbreyeri 
Clavija killipii 
Clavija lancifolia 
Clavija laplanadae 
Clavija latifolia 
Clavija lehmannii 
Clavija leucocraspeda 
Clavija longifolia 
Clavija macrocarpa 
Clavija macrophylla 
Clavija membranacea 
Clavija mezii 
Clavija minor 
Clavija myrmeciocarpa 
Clavija neglecta 
Clavija nutans 
Clavija obtusifolia 
Clavija ornata 
Clavija parvula 
Clavija peruviana 
Clavija plumbea 
Clavija poeppigii 
Clavija procera 
Clavija pubens 
Clavija pungens 
Clavija repanda 
Clavija rodekiana 
Clavija sanctae-martae 
Clavija serratifolia 
Clavija spinosa 
Clavija subandina 
Clavija tarapotana 
Clavija umbrosa 
Clavija venosa 
Clavija wallnoeferi 
Clavija weberbaueri

References

Primulaceae
Primulaceae genera